Bolbe lowi is a species of praying mantis in the family Nanomantidae. It is endemic to Australia

See also
List of Australian stick insects and mantids
Mantodea of Oceania
List of mantis genera and species

References

lowi
Mantodea of Oceania
Insects of Australia
Endemic flora of Australia
Insects described in 1969